Secret Agent's Destiny, also translated as Resident's Way, is a 1970 Soviet adventure film directed by Venyamin Dorman.

It is the second of four films based around the same character, the spy Mikhail Tulyev, played by Georgy Zhzhyonov. The first one, The Secret Agent's Blunder (Resident's Mistake) was made in 1968, while Resident Return (Resident Is Back) followed Destiny in 1982, with  released in 1986.

Plot 
Soviet counterintelligence agents do not stop "playing" with the enemy using the spy Tulyev.

Cast 
 Georgy Zhzhyonov as Mikhail Tulyev
 Mikhail Nozhkin as Pavel Sinitsyn
 Andrei Vertogradov as Vladimir Borkov
 Yefim Kopelyan as General Sergeev
 Rostislav Plyatt as Kazin
 Nikolai Prokopovich as Colonel Markov
 Nikolay Grabbe
 Zhanna Bolotova as Yulia
 Eve Kivi as Rimma
 Eleonora Shashkova as Marya

References

External links 
 

1970 films
1970s Russian-language films
Soviet adventure films
1970s adventure films